The lemon bar, also called lemon square, is a popular type of dessert bar in the United States consisting of a thin, shortbread crust and a lemon curd filling.

Origin and history 
The first widely published lemon bar recipe was printed in the Chicago Daily Tribune on August 27, 1962, and submitted by Eleanor Mickelson. However, mentions of lemon bars and lemon squares can be found in earlier community cookbooks or small local newspapers.

There are two basic elements to a lemon bar, lemon curd and shortbread, each with their own unique history.

Lemon curd 
Lemon curd dates back to 19th century England. However, early lemon curd was different than the lemon curd used today, such as in lemon bars. Instead, it consisted of acidic cream that formed curds and then was drained through a cheesecloth to separate out the whey.

Shortbread 
Shortbread originated in Scotland as far back as the 12th century.

Present day 
Lemon bars are a popular dessert in the United States and are common at many different types of events. There is even a National Lemon bar Day that occurs on October 15 each year. This day was created by Michael McCarthy in 2019 after he baked lemon bars for an event and many people had never had them before.

Ingredients 
Recipes vary slightly, but lemon bar recipes call for lemon juice, and many suggest fresh squeezed. Other ingredients include butter, white sugar, flour, eggs, and salt. Many recipes also list confectioners sugar, also called powdered sugar, for dusting on the top after the bars are baked. Many variations of lemon bars also exist.

Allergens 
Allergens in lemon bars may include: eggs, dairy, and gluten. There are variations to accommodate for dietary restrictions such as gluten-free Lemon bars and vegan lemon Bars.

Nutrition information 
Krusteaz "Meyer Lemon bars" box mix lists 140 calories as prepared in one serving, a 2-inch bar. There are also 3 grams of fat, 26 grams of carbohydrates, 20 grams of sugar, 90 milligrams of sodium, and less than 1 gram of protein in a prepared box of Krusteaz "Meyer Lemon bars." Nutrition information will vary by recipe.

Baking 

Lemon bars, as well as many other dessert bars are typically baked in the oven in a 9x13 inch baking pan. Baking pans can be made out of many different materials, and the material suggested may vary by recipe.

The bars are baked in two steps. First, the crust is baked part of the way to ensure that it will not combine with the lemon curd and can support it. Second, the curd is added on top of the crust and the bars are baked the rest of the way. Lemon bars are baked at a temperature below 400 °F to avoid over-baking.

There are also options for lemon bar box-mix.

Serving 
After the bars are baked and have cooled, they can be cut into squares or triangles. They can also be dusted with confectioners sugar, whatever the consumers preference might be.

See also 

 Fruit curd
 Lemon tart
 List of American desserts
 List of lemon dishes and drinks
 Shortbread

References 

Baked goods
Lemon dishes
Desserts